The civil flag of the Lublin Voivodeship, Poland is a tricolour rectangle, with three horizontal stripes: white (silver), red, and yellow (golden), with the coat of arms of the voivodeship, in form of the white (silver) malejumping cervus, with a yellow (golden) crown on its neck, placed on the red escutcheon, placed in the centre of the flag. The cervus is facing left. The top and bottom stripes are twice the size of the middle stripe.

Design 
The civil flag of the Lublin Voivodeship is a tricolour rectangle, with the aspect ratio of height to width of 5:8. It consist of three horizontal stripes, from top to bottom: white (silver), red, and yellow (golden), of which, the top and bottom stripes are twice the size of the middle stripe. In the centre is located coat of arms of the voivodeship, in form of the white (silver) male jumping cervus, with a yellow (golden) crown on its neck, placed on the red escutcheon.The cervus is facing left. The colours of the flag had been based on the colours of the coat of arms of the voivodeship.

The state flag of the Lublin Voivodeship is a red rectangle, with the aspect ratio of height to width of 3:4. It features the white (silver) male cervus mid-jump, with a yellow (golden) crown on its neck.

History 
The flag had been adopted by the Lublin Regional Assembly, on 14 June 2004, in the resolution no. XIX/316/04. The flag and the coat of arms had been designed by graphic designer Andrzej Heidrich.

The state flag was based on the banner of Lublin Land used during the battle of Grunwald, which depicted a white (silver) jumping cervus, with a yellow (golden) crown on its neck, placed on the red background.

See also 
 Coat of arms of the Lublin Voivodeship

References 

Lublin Voivodeship
Lublin Voivodeship
Lublin Voivodeship
2004 establishments in Poland
Lublin Voivodeship
Lublin Voivodeship